"The Rock and Roll Dead Zone" is a short story by Stephen King. It was published in 2013 as part of the anthology work Hard Listening: The Greatest Rock Band Ever (of Authors) Tells All.

Plot summary 
"The Rock and Roll Dead Zone" is a first-person narrative with Stephen King himself as the storyteller. It is one of a small number of King's works of fiction to feature King himself as a character.

The story opens with an exhausted King returning to his home after a book tour. Upon arriving, King is met by his childhood friend Edward "Goochie" Gooch, a Falstaffian rock and roll aficionado who is wont to bring King grandiose investment propositions. After making himself a sandwich, Gooch delivers a presentation to King on his latest idea: a theme park named "The Rock and Roll Dead Zone" (a homage to King's novel The Dead Zone), for which Gooch is seeking a $30,000,000 investment from King. 

Gooch shows King various artist's impressions of the theme park, which is to feature dioramas portraying locations relating to rock and roll songs about death. These are to include the "Honey House" (from Bobby Goldsboro's "Honey"), the "Eddie Cochrane Memorial Highway, leading straight to Dead Man's Curve" (from Jan and Dean's "Dead Man's Curve"), the "Dickey Lee Go-Kart Arena" (from Ray Peterson's "Tell Laura I Love Her"), "Big John's Mine of Doom" (from The Buoys' "Timothy"), and the "Tallahatchie Bridge" (from Bobbie Gentry's "Ode to Billie Joe") over the "Moody River" (from Pat Boone's "Moody River"). 

The story ends with King offering to give Gooch Mitch Albom's phone number, telling Gooch "you need somebody who's more hip to the afterlife".

Publication 
"The Rock and Roll Dead Zone" was published in 2013 as part of the anthology ebook Hard Listening: The Greatest Rock Band Ever (of Authors) Tells All, edited by Sam Barry.

References

See also 
 Stephen King short fiction bibliography

External links 
 Hard Listening at StephenKing.com

2013 short stories
Amusement parks in fiction
First-person narrative fiction
Rock and roll
Short stories by Stephen King